Ramesh McLean Srivastava (born June 26, 1983) is an American singer and songwriter. He is perhaps best known as the lead vocalist of the indie rock band Voxtrot, active from 2003 to 2010. After the dissolution of Voxtrot, Srivastava has also released solo material under his name, including his debut album, The King, in 2014.

Early life
Ramesh Srivastava was born  on June 26, 1983, in Austin, Texas, to Patricia Noel Goettel and Rajendra Kumar Srivastava. His father is from Lucknow, Uttar Pradesh, while his mother is American, from New Jersey. He attended Leander High School in Leander, Texas, and later attended the University of Glasgow in Glasgow, Scotland, majoring in literature.

Career
In 2002, after graduating from college and returning to Texas, Srivastava formed the band Voxtrot in Austin. They recorded one extended play and released a self-titled album, which garnered critical acclaim. In 2010, the group disbanded, with Srivastava stating that their career trajectory had been one of "long, simmering build, explosion, and almost instantaneous decay." The band played their final show at the Bowery Ballroom in New York City on June 26, 2010, Srivastava's twenty-seventh birthday.

In 2014, Srivastava released his first solo record, The King. The record was performed live as a four-piece on a nationwide tour of Japan. On May 6, 2022, the group announced they were embarking on a reunion tour through the latter part of the year, along with the release of archival recordings.

Personal life
In 2007, the Dallas Voice published an article in which it was implied that Srivastava was gay, though a subsequent article by the same publication stated that this was unsubstantiated. In June 2020, Srivastava confirmed publicly in an Instagram post that he is gay.

Discography

Voxtrot
Extended plays
Raised by Wolves (2005)
Your Biggest Fan (2006)
Mothers, Sisters, Daughters & Wives (2006)

Albums
Voxtrot (2007)

Ramesh
The King (2014)

See also
Voxtrot

References

External links

Official site
Ramesh on Bandcamp

1983 births
Living people
Alumni of the University of Glasgow
American indie pop musicians
American indie rock musicians
American male musicians of Indian descent
American male singers of Indian descent
American gay musicians
American male guitarists
Musicians from Austin, Texas
People from Travis County, Texas
Singers from Texas
Songwriters from Texas
Guitarists from Texas
21st-century American male singers
21st-century American singers
21st-century American guitarists
American male songwriters